Aphanostola sparsipalpis is a species of moth in the family Gelechiidae. It was described by Edward Meyrick in 1931. It is found in Sri Lanka.

The wingspan is about 6 mm. The wings are all grey.

References

Gelechiinae
Moths described in 1931
Moths of Asia